The Cantonal rebellion was a cantonalist insurrection that took place during the First Spanish Republic between July 1873 and January 1874. Its protagonists were the "intransigent" federal Republicans, who wanted to establish immediately the Federal Republic from the bottom-up without waiting for the Constituent Cortes to draft and approve the new Federal Constitution, as defended by the president of the Executive Power of the Republic Francisco Pi y Margall, a Proudhonian Mutualist supported by the "centrist" and "moderate" sectors of the Federal Democratic Republican Party.

Pi y Margall was the principal translator of Proudhon's works, according to George Woodcock "These translations were to have a profound and lasting effect on the development of Spanish anarchism after 1870, but before that time Proudhonian ideas, as interpreted by Pi, already provided much of the inspiration for the federalist movement which sprang up in the early 1860s." According to the Encyclopædia Britannica "During the Spanish revolution of 1873, Pi y Margall attempted to establish a decentralized, or “cantonalist," political system on Proudhonian lines."

The rebellion began on 12 July, 1873 with the Canton of Cartagena – although three days earlier the Petroleum Revolution had broken out in Alcoy at the initiative of the Spanish section of the International Workers Association (AIT) – spreading in the following days through the regions of Valencia, Murcia and Andalusia. In these areas, cantons were formed, whose federation would constitute the base of the Spanish Federal Republic. The political theory on which the cantonal movement was based was the "pactist" federalism of Francisco Pi y Margall against whose government the "intransigent" federal republicans (paradoxically) rose up against. When the policy of the Pi y Margall government failed to combine persuasion with repression to end the insurrection, the government that replaced him chaired by the "moderate" Nicolás Salmerón did not hesitate to employ the army led by generals Arsenio Martínez Campos and Manuel Pavia to crush the rebellion, a policy that accentuated the next government of the also "moderate" Emilio Castelar, who, after suspending the sessions of the Cortes, began the siege of Cartagena, the last stronghold of the rebellion. Cartagena would not fall into the hands government until 12 January, a week after the coup of Pavia that ended the federal Republic giving way to the dictatorship of Serrano.

Although the cantonal rebellion was considered a "separatist" movement by the Government of the Republic, the current historiography highlights that the rebellion only sought to reform the structure of the state, without ever wanting to break the unity of Spain.

Background

The proclamation of the Republic
On 11 February 1873, the day after the abdication of Amadeo I, the National Assembly proclaimed Spain to be a Republic by 258 votes against 32, but without defining it as unitary or federal, postponing the decision to future Constituent Courts.

That same day, the self-proclaimed National Assembly appointed the Federal Republican Estanislao Figueras as president of the republic. His government needed to reestablish the order that was being altered by the federal republicans themselves, who had understood the proclamation of the Republic as a new revolution. Federal republicans seized power by force in many places, where they formed "revolutionary juntas" that did not recognize the government of Figueras, because it was a coalition government with the former monarchists of the Radical Party, and branded the "Republicans of Madrid" as lukewarm. In many villages of Andalusia, the Republic was something so identified with the distribution of land that the peasants demanded the municipalities immediately parcel out the most significant farms in the town ... some of which previously formed part of communal property before confiscation. In almost all places the Republic also identified itself with the abolition of the hated quintas (compulsory military service for young people).

Responsible for the task of restoring order was the Minister of the Interior Francisco Pi y Margall, paradoxically the main defender of "pactist" federalism from the bottom-up, which the juntas were putting into practice. Pi achieved the dissolution of the juntas and the replacement of the municipalities that were forcibly suspended, in "a clear proof of his commitment to respect legality even against the wishes of his own supporters", although he maintained the armed republican and old monarchical militias.

Pi y Margall also needed to deal twice with the proclamation of a "Catalan State" by the Provincial Deputation of Barcelona, dominated by "intransigent" federal Republicans. First on 12 February, the day after the proclamation of the Republic in Madrid, Pi y Margall managed to convince them to give up by telegrams sent to them from Madrid. The second took place on 8 March, when an attempted coup d'état took place in Madrid, the radicals were trying to prevent the republic from proclaiming itself federal by preventing the convening of the Constituent Courts. This time, the telegrams of Pi y Margall were not enough. It was necessary that four days later, on 12 March, Estanislao Figueras himself went to Barcelona and asked the provincial government to withdraw the independence declaration.

A third attempted coup d'état by the Radical Party, attempting to paralyze the convocation of the Constituent Courts, took place on 23 April. The "intransigent" Republicans and the press put pressure on the government to proclaim the Federal Republic without waiting for the Constituent Courts to convene, but the government adhered to the law. Pi y Margall received hundreds of telegrams that said:

The proclamation of the Federal Republic 
In May, the elections for the Constituent Courts were held. Because of the withdrawal of the rest of the parties, an overwhelming victory was achieved by the Federal Democratic Republican Party. But this situation was misleading because in reality the federal Republican deputies of the Cortes were divided into three groups:
 The "intransigents" with about 60 deputies formed the left of the House and advocated that the Courts build the Federal Republic from the bottom up, from the municipality to the cantons and from these to the federal level. They also defended the introduction of social reforms that would improve the living conditions of the proletariat. This sector of the federal Republicans did not have a clear leader, although they recognized José María Orense as their "patriarch." Alongside him were Nicolás Estévanez, Francisco Díaz Quintero, the generals Juan Contreras and Blas Pierrad, and the writers Roque Barcia and Manuel Fernández Herrero. The model they favored was that of Switzerland.
 The "centrists" led by Pi y Margall agreed with the "intransigents" that the objective was to build a federal republic, but they wanted to do so from the top-down, first drafting a federal Constitution and then proceeding to the formation of cantons. The number of deputies that this sector had was not very large and on many occasions they acted divided in the votes, although they mostly favored the proposals of the "intransigents". They favored the model used by the United States.
 The "moderates" constituted the right of the Chamber and were led by Emilio Castelar and Nicolás Salmerón and defended the formation of a democratic Republic that would accommodate all liberal options. They rejected the "intransigent" proposal to convert the Cortes into a revolutionary power and agreed with the "centrists" that the priority of the Cortes was to approve a new Constitution. They constituted the largest group of the Chamber, although there were certain differences between the followers of Castelar, who were in favor of the conciliation with the radicals and constitutionalists, and the followers of Salmerón, who advocated that the Republic should only be based on the alliance of "old" republicans. Their favored model was that of France.

Despite this division, they had no problem proclaiming the Federal Democratic Republic on 8 June, a week after the Constituent Courts were opened under the presidency of the veteran "intransigent" Republican José María Orense, by 218 votes against two.

The opposition of the "intransigents" to the federal governments of Figueras and Pi y Margall 
As soon as the Constituent Courts next met, Estanislao Figueras returned his powers to the Chamber and proposed that Pi y Margall be appointed to replace him, but the intransigents were opposed to this and got Pi to give up on his attempt at taking power. Figueras then learned that the "intransigent" generals Juan Contreras and Blas Pierrad were preparing a coup d'état to start the federal Republic "from below", outside the Government and the Cortes, which made Figueras fear for his life. On 10 June, Figueras, who was already suffering a severe depression from the death of his wife, fled to France.

The attempted coup d'état came the next day when a mass of federal Republicans, instigated by the "intransigents", surrounded the building of the Congress of Deputies in Madrid while General Contreras, commanding the militia of the Volunteers of the Republic, took the Ministry of War. The "moderates" Emilio Castelar and Nicolás Salmerón proposed that Pi and Margall occupy the vacant presidency of the Executive Power as he was the most prestigious leader within the Republican party. "Castelar and Salmerón believed that Pi y Margall, close to the intransigents, who had given them their ideological base and organization, could control and satisfy the parliamentary left through a conciliation cabinet." Finally, the "intransigents" accepted the proposal, although under the condition that it was the Courts that elected the members of the government to preside over Pi y Margall.

The government program presented by Pi y Margall to the Cortes was based on the need to end the Third Carlist War, separate Church and State, abolish slavery and pass reforms in favor of working women and children. It also included the return of communal property to the people through a law that modified confiscation, but the law was not approved. Another, the purpose of which was to transfer land to tenants in exchange for the payment of a census, was also rejected by the Cortes. The one that was passed was a law that dictated rules "to redeem rents and pensions." Finally, the program included, as a priority, the drafting and approval of the new Constitution of the Federal Republic.

Immediately, the government of Pi y Margall met with the opposition of the "intransigents", because they did not include some of the historical policies of the federalists in their program, such as "the abolition of tobacco, the lottery, court costs and the consumption tax, which was replaced in 1870 due to lack of resources". The ineffectiveness of the government, because of the blockade work carried out by the "intransigent" ministers, led to a proposal to grant the President of the Executive Power the power to appoint and dismiss their ministers freely. Its approval would allow Pi to replace the intransigent ministers with others from the "moderate" sector, thus creating a coalition government between the Pimargalian "centrists" and the "moderates" of Castelar and Salmerón. The response of the "intransigents" was to demand that the Courts be converted into a Convention, from which a Public Health Board would emanate that would hold executive power, a proposal that was rejected by the majority of deputies who supported the government. Then on 27 June, the "intransigents" filed a vote of censure against the government, which included the paradoxical request that its president Pi y Margall be passed to their ranks. The crisis was resolved the next day, as the "intransigents" feared, with the entry of the "moderates" into the government and the strengthening the Pimargalians' presence. The program of the new government was summed up in the motto "order and progress".

On 30 June, Pi y Margall asked the Cortes for extraordinary powers to end the Carlist war, although limited to the Basque Country and Catalonia. The "intransigents" viciously opposed the proposal because they understood it as the imposition of "tyranny" and the "loss of democracy," although the government assured them that it would only apply to the Carlists and not to the federal Republicans. Once the proposal was approved by the Cortes, the government published a manifesto in which, after justifying the extraordinary powers it had received, it announced conscription to the Army of the quintos and the reserves, because «the country demands the sacrifice of all its children, and he who does not do so to the best of his strength, will not be liberal or Spanish».

The beginning of the cantonal rebellion and the resignation of Pi y Margall

The "Intransigents" abandon the Cortes
The "intransigent" response to the "order and progress" policy of the Pi y Margall government was to leave the Cortes on 1 July, motivated by Madrid's civil governor limiting the guarantees of individual rights. In the Manifesto they made public on 2 July they showed their determination "to immediately raise the reforms that the Republican Party had been sustaining in its tireless propaganda" justified because in their judgment:

Only the deputy Navarrete remained in the Cortes who, on that same day, explained the reasons for their withdrawal, accusing the Pi y Margall government of lacking energy and of having compromised and even faltered against the enemies of the Federal Republic. Pi y Margall replied in that same session:

After the abandonment of the Cortes, the "intransigents" urged the immediate and direct formation of cantons, initiating the cantonal rebellion. They formed a Public Health Committee in Madrid to lead it, although « what prevailed was the initiative of the local federal republicans, who became owners of the situation in their respective cities ». Although there were cases like the one in Málaga where local authorities led the uprising, most of them formed revolutionary juntas. Two weeks after the withdrawal of the Cortes, the revolt was a fact in Murcia, Valencia and Andalusia.

Although there was no organizational center of the rebellion and each canton made its own proclamations, the rebels "beyond the logical local particularities" pursued the same purposes: "the substitution of all types of governmental or jurisdictional authorities, the abolition of taxes (especially the unpopular taxes on consumption, tobacco and salt), the secularization of church property, social reforms favorable to the great mass of the dispossessed that had no other good than their labor force, a pardon for all political crimes, the dissolution of the regular army and its replacement by militia troops, and the creation of public health boards and committees as governing bodies of a popular nature».

On 18 July, once the rebellion began in Cartagena and other cities, the Madrid Public Health Committee ordered:

On 22 August, when only the cantons of Málaga and Cartagena were up and running, the "intransigent" deputy Casualdero intervened in the Cortes to explain that the uprising was not illegal and seditious but had been the result of the putting into practice of the true federal ideal, from the bottom-up. That it is the canton that legitimizes the federation and not the other way around:

The proclamation of the Cartagena Canton 

After the abandonment of the Courts, the Public Health Committee that was established in Madrid under the presidency of Roque Barcia, thought about moving to Cartagena, «because no other city possessed the characteristics of its port, well sheltered and defended by a series of strong and artillery castles that made Cartagena invulnerable both by sea and by land.» The Public Health Committee constituted the War Commission, chaired by General Juan Contreras who undertook to revolt Cartagena, Valencia, Barcelona, Seville and Murcia.

The insurrection began in Cartagena at five in the morning on 12 July, following the instructions of a "Revolutionary Public Salvation Junta" that had been set up an hour earlier on the initiative of a liaison with the committee from Madrid, Manuel Cárceles Sabater. The signal for the uprising was given by the Galeras Castle which fired a cannon, warning that the African regiment, which was going to relieve the garrison of volunteers, had retired. According to other versions of events, the cannon shot was the previously agreed signal to indicate to the frigate Almansa that the defenses had been taken.

The chief of the fort's garrison, the postman Sáez, "in his eagerness to fly a red flag despite not having one, hoisted the Turkish flag believing that the crescent would not be seen, but the Navy commander saw it, communicating it to the Minister of the Navy [the telegram read:  The castle of Galeras has raised the Turkish flag ]. A volunteer, watching over the prestige of the cause, opened a vein with the tip of his razor and stained the crescent with his blood, replacing the flag of Turkey with the red cantonal flag".

At that same time, 5 a.m. on 12 July, a group of volunteers in charge of Cárceles invaded the town hall, installing the "Revolutionary Public Salvation Junta" on the ground floor while other groups occupied the gates of the city wall. Notified by the mayor of the city, the next day the civil governor of Murcia Antonio Altadill arrived in Cartagena, accompanied by the Murcian federal deputy Antonio Gálvez Arce, known as Antonete. After assessing that the insurgents controlled the city, the governor advised the City Council to resign, which they did “in the presence of the governor of the province”. Shortly after, the Junta raised the red flag over City Hall and proclaimed the Murcian Canton, then appointing Antonete Gálvez general commander of the Army, Militia and Navy forces. In the Manifesto that was made public that same afternoon, the "Public Salvation Junta", constituted "by the will of the majority of the republican people of this town" justified the proclamation of the Murcian Canton as an act of defense of the Federal Republic. Then commanded by Antonete Gálvez and General Juan Contreras, president of the War Committee that had moved from Madrid, the cantonal army seized the naval base's warships without causing casualties.

The civil governor telegraphed the president of the Executive Power Francisco Pi y Margall that neither the Volunteers of the Republic nor the Civil Guard obeyed his orders to abandon Murcia. When he went to Madrid he was stopped by insurgents at the Alguazas station, 20 kilometers from the capital. Thus, on the morning of 15 July, the «Revolutionary Junta» of Murcia was established, chaired by the deputy Jerónimo Poveda, who raised the red flag in the City Hall and then in the archbishop's palace that became the seat of the Junta. In the Manifesto he made public, the "Revolutionary Junta" of Murcia presented the first measures he had taken ("pardon for all political prisoners", "the seizure of church assets", "the redistribution of property" etc.) and explained the reasons for its constitution:

In the manifesto, the revolutionary Junta of Murcia established that the «Revolutionary Juntas of the People will organize in them the municipal administration according to the federal system» and also announced that they were going to appoint a commission that «attends the armament and defenses of the Murcian Canton» and another that «establishes relations with the neighboring provinces». Both would be "under the orders of General Contreras and citizen Antonio Gálvez", implicitly establishing the subordination of the Junta of Murcia to that of Cartagena in the direction of the Murciano Canton, which was thus established.

On 15 July, General Juan Contreras made public a Manifesto in which he communicated that he had just risen in arms to the shout of Federal cantons! And showed off the forces that supported him, especially the Navy, and asked the chiefs and officers of the "centralist" forces – he called those who remain faithful to the government of Pi y Margall and the legislature – not to fire "neither against the people nor against their brothers in arms." He also promised that:

The response of Pi y Margall's government 

Pi y Margall acknowledged that what the "Intransigents" were doing was putting his own "pactist" federalism theory into practice from the bottom up, but he condemned the insurrection anyway. He claimed that theory was intended for an occupation of power "through armed revolution" not for a "Republic [that] has come by the agreement of an Assembly, in a legal and peaceful manner".

The Pi y Margall government was overwhelmed by the cantonal rebellion and also by the continuation of the Third Carlist War, since the supporters of Don Carlos campaigned with total freedom in Vascongadas, Navarra and Catalonia, and extended their action throughout the country, while the suitor Carlos VII had formed a rival government in Estella, while the collusion of France allowed them to receive external help.

Another focus of conflict for the Pi y Margall government was the Petroleum Revolution that had started in Alcoy on 7 July with a strike in the paper industry. The social and cantonal unrest in Andalusia, such as Carmona, San Fernando, Sanlucar de Barrameda, Seville and Málaga, were added to this conflict.

Still, Pi y Margall refused to declare the state of emergency proposed by the "moderate" sector of his party, which included the suspension of the Cortes, because he trusted that the rapid approval of the federal Constitution and the way of dialogue would bring the rebels into reason. However, he did not hesitate to suppress the rebels, as evidenced by the telegram sent by the Minister of the Interior to all civil governors on 13 July, as soon as he became aware of the proclamation of the "Murcian Canton" the day before in Cartagena:

But at the same time in the early morning of 14 July, Pi y Margall sent a long telegram to the civil governor of Murcia to try to convince the insurgents of the Canton of Cartagena that what they were doing was not defending the federal Republic but putting it in danger:

Pi y Margall's policy of combining persuasion and repression to end the cantonal rebellion can also be seen in the instructions given to Republican General Ripoll, leading an army consisting of 1677 infantry, 357 horses and 16 pieces of artillery, from a base of operations in Córdoba:

On 14 July a debate took place in the Cortes at the proposal of the deputy for Cartagena, a federal Republican of the "moderate" sector, who after stating that "I have always been on the side of the policy represented by Mr. Pi y Margall" accused him of having crossed his arms – "A great way to make order!" he said – to which Pi replied that "the Government has not had weaknesses, what is lacking are material means". The next day Pi y Margall asked the Cortes to quickly discuss and approve the new Constitution to stop the continuation of the cantonal rebellion. Two days later, on 17 July, the Spanish Draft Constitution of 1873 had been written by Emilio Castelar, but three "Intransigent" members of the Constitutional Commission presented an alternative draft. In this climate of division Pi y Margall tried to form a new government that grouped all the sectors of the Chamber together. For this he asked for a vote of confidence, but he obtained the support of only 93 deputies, compared to 119 that the "moderate" Nicolás Salmerón obtained. What had happened was that since Pi y Margall's policy of persuasion and repression had failed to stop the cantonal rebellion, the "moderate" sector had withdrawn its support by voting in favor of Nicolás Salmerón. The next day Pi y Margall resigned after 37 days of office.

On the same day of his resignation, 18 July, the "intransigent" deputy Casalduero intervened. He accused Pi y Margall of having betrayed the ideas that he had defended until then – the construction of the Federation from the bottom up – and that he had been swept away by the "moderate" sector that advocated repression.

A month and a half after having resigned, and when the Cortes were about to be suspended at the proposal of the new president Emilio Castelar, Pi y Margall explained to the House why at that time he had defended the federal construction from the top-down, and not from bottom-up as he had always advocated:

The government of Nicolas Salmeron and the repression of the cantonal movement 

Nicolás Salmerón, elected President of the Executive Power with 119 votes in favor and 93 votes against, was a "moderate" federalist who defended the need to reach an understanding with conservative groups and a slow transition to the federal republic. As soon as he took office he replaced the Republican General Ripoll – appointed by Pi y Margall – with General Manuel Pavia, of doubtful loyalty to the Federal Republic, at the head of the expeditionary army of Andalusia. When, on 19 July, Salmerón met with Pavia to offer him the position, he said, according to Pavia himself: “If you get a soldier to fire his rifle against a cantonalist, order will have been saved”, which contrasts with the instructions Pi y Margall gave to Ripoll.

The formation of the provisional Government of the Spanish Federation 
The ascendence of Salmerón to the presidency of the Executive Power caused an intensification of the cantonal rebellion because the "intransigents" thought that with him it would be impossible to even reach the Federal Republic "from above", as Pi y Margall had assured them. They resolved that through the route of the cantonal insurrection, they would finally bring down the centralist political system of a unitary republic and establish "from below" the federal political system in Spain, that was previously proclaimed on 8 June in the Constituent Courts. The Decree of 20 July, by which the Government of Salmerón declared the cantonal warships to be pirates, produced a response on 22 July, whereby the cantonalists declared the government of Madrid a traitor. On 24 July, in agreement with the intransigent deputies and the Junta of Cartagena, they created the "Provisional Directory" as the superior authority to give unity and cohesion to the cantonal movement, and extend it with the formation of new cantons. The Provisional Board of Directors was composed of three members: Juan Contreras, Antonio Gálvez and Eduardo Romero Germes. Two days later the provisional Board of Directors was extended to nine components, incorporating the deputies José Mª Pérez Rubio, Alberto Araus and Alfredo Sauvalle, the quarterback Félix Ferrer and the member of the Public Health Board of Madrid Nicolás Calvo Guayti. And finally on 27 July, the Provisional Junta became the "Provisional Government of the Spanish Federation".

The extension and the intensification of the rebellion

After the formation of the Salmerón government, the extension of the cantonal movement took place, so that by 23 July the insurrection had already extended to the regions of Andalusia and Levante, and even to the provinces of Salamanca and Ávila. When added to the Carlist conflict, this meant that thirty-two provinces of Spain were up in arms.

On 17 July, during a massive act of homage to the "Volunteers of the Republic" who had returned by train to combat the Internationalists in Alcoy, the crowd harangued by Rep. Feliu shouted "Long live the Valencian Canton!". The next day the militia was deployed to the strategic points of the city and at 11 pm the proclamation of Valencian Canton was already a fact. On 19 July, the members of the "Revolutionary Junta" of the Canton were elected and chaired by Pedro Barrientos, a professor at the School of Fine Arts, while the civil governor Castejón fled to Alcira by train. On 22 July, when 178 towns in the province of Valencia had already joined the Canton, the president of the Junta made the official proclamation of the Valencian Canton in the Plaza of Valencia, which was renamed "the Plaza of the Federal Republic". Then 28 militia battalions without weapons were paraded and the La Marseillaise anthem was played. In an address the "Revolutionary Junta" reaffirmed its commitment to the maintenance of order:

A day earlier, on 21 July, the federal deputy Francisco González Chermá had left Valencia, in charge of 100 volunteers, two companies of police and one of infantry to proclaim the Canton of Castellón. When he arrived in Castellón de la Plana he dissolved the Provincial Council and proclaimed the Canton, but unlike what happened in the province of Valencia the towns of the province of Castellón opposed cantonalism, since many of them were Carlists. This made the rapid dissolution of the canton by conservative forces possible. González Chermá managed to escape by train to Valencia. The canton of Castellón lasted only five days, from 21 to 26 July 1873.

On 19 July, the canton of Cádiz was proclaimed as soon as the Government of Salmerón had been formed. The consul of the United States in the city sent a report to his government describing what happened as « a real revolution ». The Public Health Committee, chaired by Fermin Salvochea, reported that it had been constituted "in order to save the federal Republic, supporting the movement initiated in Cartagena, Seville and other towns." Both the civil and military governors joined the insurrection and the cantonal red flag began to fly in all official buildings. From the Canton of Seville they received abundant war material and their position was reinforced with the incorporation of La Linea de la Concepcion and San Fernando, but not so the naval base whose commander "awaits orders from Madrid". When Cádiz was bombed from La Carraca, the Public Health Committee accused the seafarers of wanting to "bully the people, conclude with the national freedoms and obtain promotions and decorations at the cost of our blood ».

On 21 July, the Canton of Málaga was proclaimed. Although since the proclamation of the Federal Republic the previous month, Málaga was already practically independent from the central power thanks to the unwritten pact between Francisco Solier, one of the leaders of the Málaga "intransigents", and the government of Pi y Margall, who after appointing Solier civil governor, only demanded in return that they maintain normal relations with the Government. On 25 July, at the meeting to elect the members of the Public Health Committee, several dozens of "intransigent" Republicans from the Carvajal sector were arrested and the next day 45 of them were deported to Melilla .

Other uprisings occurred in Andalusia with the proclamations of the cantons of Seville (19 July) and Granada (on 20 July), as well as in Loja, Bailén, Andújar, Tarifa and Algeciras. In the Murcia Region there were proclamations of cantons in Almansa and in Jumilla, although there are doubts about the existence of the latter.

The cantonal rebellion also occurred in some places in the provinces of Salamanca and Toledo. In Extremadura, the attempt to constitute cantons in Coria, Hervás and Plasencia, as well as the publication of the newspaper El Cantón Extremeño, on whose pages the creation of the canton linked to Lusitania was encouraged and readers were urged to take up arms, if necessary, to defend these ideals.

According to Jorge Vilches, «common points in the cantonal declarations were the abolition of unpopular taxes, such as the consumption tax on tobacco and salt, the secularization of the goods of the clergy, the establishment of measures favorable to the workers, the pardon of prisoners for crimes against the State, the replacement of the Army by the militia and the formation of committees of public health ».

The maritime and land expeditions of the Canton of Cartagena 

The maritime and land expeditions undertaken by the Canton of Cartagena had two essential objectives. Firstly, to extend the rebellion thus making it possible to distract enemy forces and break their presumed encirclement; and secondly, to provide subsistence to the 9,000-strong forces concentrated in Cartagena, in addition to providing the necessary money to cope with war expenses, because the resources obtained in Cartagena itself were insufficient.

The first maritime expedition took place on 20 July, in a simultaneous action by the paddle steamer Fernando el Católico under General Contreras towards Mazarrón and Águilas on the Murcian coast, and the ironclad warship Vitoria under the command of "Antonete" Gálvez towards Alicante. In principle the two missions were successful as Mazarrón and Águilas joined the Murcian Canton and Gálvez proclaimed the Canton of Alicante, establishing a Public Health Board. But three days after the return of the Vitoria to Cartagena, the "centralist" authorities regained control of Alicante and dissolved the canton. Galvez returned in the Vigilante, which was requisitioned in the port of Alicante, and made a stop in Torrevieja where a commission met him to join the Murcian Canton, ceasing to belong to the province of Alicante. But when on 23 July the Vigilante was about to enter Cartagena, he was intercepted by the armored frigate  using the decree just approved by the government of Nicolás Salmerón that declared "pirates" of all ships flying the red cantonal flag, so they could be captured by ships of any country within even the Spanish jurisdictional waters. In addition the commodore Reinhold von Werner, commander of the "Friedrich Carl", demanded the delivery of the frigate "Vitoria" because she had also raised the red flag. Finally the Cartagena Board handed over the Vigilante to Werner, but not the Vitoria that was safe at the port.

Meanwhile, in Murcia, the first major land expedition was organized for Lorca, a city that did not want to join the Canton of Cartagena, as Totana and Alhama had already done, after they were helped by a column of volunteers. The cantonal force composed of 2,000 men and four pieces of artillery, under the command of "Antonete" Galvez, arrived on 25 July raising the flag in the City Hall and establishing a Public Salvation Board. But the Murcian canton in Lorca only lasted one day because as soon as Galvez's forces returned to Murcia on the 26th, with several thousand pesetas as a war contribution, the local authorities that had left the city returned and dismissed the Junta.

The second maritime expedition aimed to revolt the Andalusian coast from Almería to Málaga. On 28 July, under the command of General Contreras the steam frigate Almansa and the Vitoria left Cartagena, acclaimed by the crowd, with two regiments on board plus a Marine infantry battalion. When the next day the expedition arrived at Almería, Contreras demanded a commission of representatives of the Provincial Council and the City Council who proposed on board the Numancia the payment of 500,000 pesetas as a war contribution and the abandonment of the city of military forces so that the people could freely decide whether to proclaim the Canton or not. The response was negative and the local authorities prepared the defense of the square, while the majority of Almería's civilian population left the city. On the morning of the 30th, the bombing of the city defenses and military buildings began, which was answered from Almeria. The city did not give up, so General Contreras that same night set course for Motril on the coast of Granada where he arrived at dawn the next day. Contreras landed the injured, visited the city and received financial aid in the form of promissory notes to be paid in Málaga for an amount of 160,000 reales.

On 1 August when the Almansa was in the waters of Málaga it was flanked by the British ironclad warship  and German , that in application of Salmerón's "piracy decree" forced it to return, along with the Vitoria that had lagged behind – the reason they argued was that the Cantonal frigates were preparing to bomb Málaga. Upon arriving at Escombreras, near Cartagena, the crews of the two frigates were forced to disembark and unload the cannons while General Contreras remained detained in the ``Friedrich Carl, although he was released shortly thereafter. The Almansa and the Vitoria remained in British custody and were taken to Gibraltar where they would be returned to the Spanish government.

The second land expedition was organized in Cartagena on 30 July and was aimed at Orihuela, a city of Carlist predominance. It was sent, as the first terrestrial expedition to Lorca, by "Antonete" Gálvez and had forces from Cartagena – the Iberia and Mendigorría regiments – and from Murcia – a body of volunteers under the command of a brother-in-law from Gálvez. They entered the city at dawn, facing civilian guards and police officers ready for their defense. In the fighting, five guards were killed and nine were injured, while the cantonalists saw one dead and three injured. 14 civilians and 40 police officers were taken prisoner. After their victory in the so-called "battle of Orihuela", they returned to Cartagena the next day, along with the civil guards and police who were carrying prisoners. There the cantonalist general Félix Ferrer addressed the following congratulations: 

At the beginning of August, "Antonete" Gálvez and General Contreras headed a third land expedition, composed of 3000 men distributed in three trains, in the direction of Chinchilla to cut off the general Arsenio Martínez Campos’ railroad communication with Madrid. The first skirmishes took place at the Chinchilla railway station, where the cantonalists manage to evict the troops sent by Martínez Campos, upon learning of the cantonalist's plans. But when the cantonalists received the news that the canton of Valencia had fallen, they withdrew. The "centralist" forces counterattacked, supported by artillery, which caused panic and disruption within the Murcian canton. Finally Gálvez and Contreras managed to reorganize their forces, receiving the help of a reserve column that had been left in Hellín. They returned to Murcia where they arrived on the night of 10 August. The battle of Chinchilla was a disaster for the Murcian canton because they lost about 500 men, including 28 chiefs and officers, in addition to 51 wagons, four guns and 250 rifles, and especially because it left Martinez Campos free to occupy Murcia.

 The repression of the cantonal movement 

The motto of the government of Salmerón was the "rule of law", which meant that to save the Republic and the liberal institutions it was necessary to finish off the Carlists and Cantonalists. To quell the cantonal rebellion he took tough measures such as dismissing the civil governors, mayors and military who had somewhat supported the cantonalists and then appointed generals opposed to the Federal Republic such as Manuel Pavia or Arsenio Martínez Campos to send military expeditions to Andalusia and Valencia, respectively. "In addition, he mobilized the reservists, bolstered the Civil Guard with 30,000 men and appointed Government delegates in the provinces with the same powers as the Executive. He authorized the Provinces to impose war contributions and organize provincial armed bodies, and decreed that the ships held by the Canton of Cartagena be considered pirates – which meant that any vessel could take them down whether they were in Spanish waters or not". Thanks to these measures, the different cantons submitted one after another, except that of Cartagena which would resist until 12 January 1874.

General Manuel Pavia and the forces that were under his command departed on 21 July from Madrid for Andalusia on two trains, although they did not arrive in Córdoba until two days later because the route was intercepted in Despeñaperros which forced them to deviate through Ciudad Real and Badajoz. The day before his arrival, General Ripoll, who was to be relieved by General Pavia, had managed to disrupt the attempt to proclaim the canton of Córdoba by the "Volunteers of the Republic" who had come to the capital from the towns of the province, although the merit was attributed later by General Pavia, who said that the cantonalist forces dissolved when their arrival in the Cordoba capital took place. The first step Pavia took was to restore the discipline of the troops using expeditious methods and then prepared to attack the canton of Seville because its fall would demoralize the rest of the cantons of Andalusia. Pavia's troops left Córdoba for Seville on 26 July. After two days of heavy fighting on the morning of 30 July, he occupied the City Hall, although the control of the city was not completed until the next day, at the cost of 300 casualties – the cantonal casualties were many more but nobody accounted for them. The next day, 1 August, Pavia made his official entry into Seville, and some of his troops were sent to the towns of the province to proceed to disarm the forces of the Canton of Seville whose capital had just fallen.

 The Canton of Cartagena, the last stronghold of the rebellion 
 The siege of Cartagena by the government of Emilio Castelar 

On 7 September 1873, Emilio Castelar was elected to occupy the Presidency of the Executive Power, when the cantonal rebellion was practically finished, with the exception of the last stronghold of the Cartagena.

Castelar had been deeply impressed by the disorder caused by the cantonal rebellion. Thus he valued much later what the cantonal rebellion had meant for the country, according to him:

Only two days after being sworn in as President of the Executive Branch, Castelar obtained from the Cortes, thanks to the absence of the "intransigents", the granting of extraordinary powers, equal to those requested by Pi y Margall to fight the Carlists in the Basque Country and Catalonia, but now extended to all of Spain to end both the Carlist war and the cantonal rebellion. The next step was to propose the suspension of the Cortes sessions, which among other consequences would paralyze the debate and the approval of the draft federal Constitution. On 18 September, the proposal was approved with the votes of the "moderate" federal republicans and the opposition of the "centrists" of Pi y Margall and the "intransigents", who had returned to the House. Thus, the Cortes were suspended from 20 September 1873 until 2 January 1874.

The extraordinary powers that Castelar obtained and the suspension of the sessions of the Cortes allowed him to govern by decree, a faculty that he immediately used to reorganize the artillery corps, to call the reservists and summon an army of 200,000 men, and ask for a loan of 100 million pesetas to meet the war expenses.

On the same day, 18 September, when the Cortes voted to suspend their sessions, the newspaper ‘‘El Cantón Murciano’’ in Cartagena published the address that "Antonete" Gálvez had addressed to the cantonalist troops when he was appointed general commander of the citizen forces: «to whoever tells you that this place will be handed over, immediately apprehend him, for he is a traitor. This place will never be handed over. ” The morale of the 75,000 inhabitants of Cartagena at that time was still high, as shown by this song that was sung throughout the city:

Around that time, the cantonal five-peseta coins began to circulate, replacing the two-peseta coins that had been minted in early September, and which had a higher intrinsic value than was attributed to them. In the decree of the Junta in which its coinage was approved it was said: “[Cartagena]  wants to be the first to spread a living testimony of imperishable memory throughout the world that remind future generations of the cry of justice and brotherhood.  '

At the end of October and beginning of November 1873 the first signs of fatigue appeared among the population, due to the long siege to which Cartagena had been subjected since mid-August. Thus on 2 November a demonstration demanded the holding of elections, to which the Sovereign Salvation Junta agreed, but its result did not change the composition of the Junta. Meanwhile, General Ceballos managed to introduce spies and agent-provocateurs into the city, who come to offer money to the leaders of the canton, which they rejected, although some officers were arrested and imprisoned on 21 November for accepting it.

The discouragement and demoralization of the besieged increased when the bombing of the city began in late November. On 14 November the Minister of War José Sánchez Bregua informed General Ceballos that "It would be convenient to throw 5,000 projectiles into the plaza because that way the defenders' spirits could be broken or at least disturbed, so as not to allow them to remain as they have remained, completely calm." The bombing began on 26 November 1873 without warning and lasted until the last day of the siege, accounting for a total of 27,189 projectiles, "a true deluge of fire", which caused 800 wounded and twelve deaths and damage to most properties – only 28 houses were left unscathed. After the first week of bombardment in which the besiegers realized that Cartagena's defenses were still intact, General Ceballos resigned, alleging health reasons and the "lack of resources to take the place in the period that interests the Government" That is to say, before the Cortes was reopened on 2 January, when it was expected Castelar would be forced to resign. On 10 December he was replaced by general José López Domínguez.

 The surrender of Cartagena after Pavia's coup 

The approach of the constitutionalists and the radicals of Castelar met with the opposition of the "moderate" Nicolás Salmerón and his followers, who until then had supported the government, because they believed that the Republic should be built by "authentic" republicans, not by the newcomers that were "out of republican orbit." The first sign that Salmerón had stopped supporting the Castelar government came in December 1873 when his supporters in the Cortes voted along with "centrists" and "intransigents" against Castelar's proposal that elections be held to fill the vacant seats.

Following Castelar's parliamentary defeat, Cristino Martos, leader of the radicals, and General Serrano, leader of the constitutionalists, agreed to carry out a coup d'état to prevent Castelar from being replaced at the head of the Executive Branch by a vote of censure that Pi y Margall and Salmerón were expected to present as soon as the Cortes reopened on 2 January 1874 .

When the Cortes reopened on 2 January 1874, the captain general of Madrid, Manuel Pavía, the military man who was going to lead the coup, had his troops ready in case Castelar lost the parliamentary vote. On the opposite side, battalions of ‘‘Volunteers of the Republic’’ were prepared to act if Castelar won – in fact, according to Jorge Vilches, "the Cartagena cantonalists had received a call to resist until January 3, the day that an intransigent government would form that would "legalize" their situation and "cantonalize" Spain ». When the session opened, Nicolás Salmerón intervened to announce that he was withdrawing his support for Castelar. Emilio Castelar replied, calling for the establishment of the "possible Republic" with all the liberals, including the conservatives, and abandoning demagoguery.

This was followed by a vote in which the Castelar government was defeated by 100 votes in favor and 120 against. Then the constitutional deputy Fernando León y Castillo forwarded the result to General Pavía, who gave the order to lead the compromised regiments to the Congress of Deputies. It was five minutes to seven in the morning, when the vote was going to elect the federal candidate Eduardo Palanca Asensi.

When Salmerón received the order from the captain general in a note delivered by one of his assistants in which he told him to "vacate the premises," he suspended the vote and reported the extremely serious incident to the deputies. Shortly thereafter, the Civil Guard forced entry into the Congress building, firing shots into the air throughout the corridors, causing almost all deputies to leave.

Castelar declined General Pavia's offer to preside over the government because he was unwilling to remain in power through undemocratic means, so the presidency of the Executive Power of the Republic and the government was assumed by the leader of the Constitutional Party Francisco Serrano, Duke of la Torre, who set himself the priority objective of ending the cantonal rebellion and the Third Carlist War. In the Manifesto that he made public on 8 January 1874, he justified the Pavia coup, stating that the government that was going to replace Castelar's would have caused the dismemberment of Spain or the triumph of Carlist absolutism and then announced, leaving all possibilities open: Hereditary or elective Republic or Monarchy, which would convene an ordinary Courts that would designate the "form and manner in which they are to elect the supreme Magistrate of the Nation, marking their powers and electing the first to occupy such high office".

Due to the establishment of the Serrano dictatorship – the Cortes continued to be dissolved and the Constitution of 1869 was reinstated, but was subsequently suspended "until the normality of political life was assured" – it met with popular resistance in Barcelona where on 7 and 8 January barricades were erected and a general strike was declared. There were a dozen victims in the clashes with the army and the most serious events occurred in Sarriá due to an uprising led by the "Xich de les Barraquete" commanded by about 800 men. On 10 January, the Serrano government decreed the dissolution of the Spanish section of the International Workingmen's Association (AIT) for "violating property, the family and other social bases". Immediately the Civil Guard occupied all its premises and the internationalist newspapers were suspended.

When the coup of Pavia became known in Cartagena, the besieged lost all hope that their cause could triumph due to what they considered capitulation, although "stimulated by the terror that announces the next defeat, the cantons make a desperate and heroic defense, as recognized by the general José López Domínguez himself", commanded by the government army that was laying siege to the plaza. At 11 o'clock on the morning of 6 January, the artillery park's powder deposit exploded, killing the 400 people who had taken refuge there because the park was beyond the reach of enemy cannons. There is doubt if the explosion was caused by a projectile launched by the besiegers or if it was sabotage. It was the definitive blow to the capacity of resistance of the besieged and neither "Antonete" Gálvez nor General Contreras "managed to raise the spirits of that people subjected to unrelenting punishment."

On the afternoon of 11 January, a large assembly was held in which, in addition to the members of the Junta, the military, volunteers and mobilized participated. In it, it was decided on the proposal of Roque Barcia to surrender and the Revolutionary Junta commissioned Don Antonio Bonmatí i Caparrós, on behalf of the Spanish Red Cross, to parley with the head of the government army and offer the surrender of the square, despite the fact that the rest of the leaders of the Murciano Canton of Cartagena, including "Antonete" Gálvez and General Contreras, continued to resist. Shortly afterwards, a commission from the assembly led by two representatives of the Red Cross surrendered to General López Domínguez. At 9 in the morning of the following day, 12 January, the counterproposal was read before the assembly, which took the commission to the conditions required by López Domínguez in his interview the previous day, and which also included the acceptance of the pardon for the crime of rebellion that López Domínguez had offered them, with the exception of the members of the Junta, that the prisoners of war made in Chinchilla be included in the pardon and that they recognize the degrees and jobs granted during the insurrection, among other requests.

While the commission was parliamentary with General López Domínguez, most of the members of the Junta, led by "Antonete" Gálvez and General Contreras, along with hundreds of cantonalistas who also wanted to escape, boarded the frigate.  Numancia  and left the port of Cartagena at five in the afternoon on that day, 12 January, managing to evade the siege of the Government fleet thanks to its great speed and the ability of its captain, heading to Oran, where they arrived the next day.

Meanwhile, the commission returned to Cartagena with the conditions for surrender offered by General López Domínguez, which had not varied substantially from the initial ones, as the Board members who escaped supposed. The commission informed the besieged that the general would no longer negotiate and that he had given them a term to accept their conditions, which would end at 8 am the next day, 13 January. Once these were accepted, General López Domínguez entered Cartagena that day at the head of his troops. He was promoted to lieutenant general and received the Laureate Cross of Saint Ferdinand.

 Repression 
The terms of the capitulation of Cartagena granted by General López Domínguez were considered "reasonable" given the customs in use at the time, since those who surrendered arms within the plaza, both chief and officer classes, and individuals from sea and land troops, armed, volunteer and mobilized institutes, were pardoned, "with the exception of those who compose or have formed part of the Revolutionary Junta".

Instead, the Minister of the Interior, the unitary republican Eugenio García Ruiz, who was proposed for the post by General Pavía, acted with a "special fury against the federalists". He even tried to banish Francesc Pi y Margall who had had nothing to do with the cantonal rebellion, but this was not achieved because the rest of the Serrano government opposed it. "García Ruiz was a unitary and anti-federalist who had been attacking Pi y Margall in the House and in the press for years. Pi's firmness in his convictions, his inflexible character and perhaps even his status as a Catalan irritated García Ruiz, who upon being appointed Minister of the Interior believed he found the opportunity to re-express his hatred against federalism in a reliable way. "

García Ruiz imprisoned and deported hundreds of anonymous people without any other charge than that of being "cantonalists", "internationalists" or simply "agitators", and without the records of whether or not they were put on trial. Most of the deportees were sent to the Spanish colony of the Mariana Islands located in the middle of the Pacific Ocean 3000 kilometers away from the Philippine Islands – which also received "cantonal" deportees – so they were practically isolated and their families had no news of them. They presented numerous requests to the authorities, requesting that their whereabouts be ascertained – and that they are still preserved in the National Historical Archive -, which means that the authorities did not report the deaths. "In the middle of the Pacific Ocean, with a suffocating humid heat, due to its tropical situation, the deportees suffered many hardships." Only one escape from the Mariana islands is known: eight prisoners who escaped "in one of the few fishing boats that, very occasionally, made a stop there". The official figure of those deported to the Marianas and the Philippines was 1,099, but there are no data on those who were deported to Cuba, nor on those who served sentences in Spanish prisons.

As for the leaders of the cantonal movement, most escaped to Oran where they arrived on 13 January 1873. There they were detained by the French authorities until they were released on 9 February. The frigate "Numancia" was returned to the Spanish government on 17 January, but not the people traveling on board as the Spanish representatives intended. The Bourbon Restoration in Spain allowed Antonete'' Gálvez, through amnesty, to return to his native Torreagüera. At this time he would establish a strange and intimate friendship with Antonio Cánovas del Castillo, the person in charge of the Restoration, who considered Galvez a sincere, honest and brave man, although with exaggerated political ideas.

Roque Barcia did not flee on the frigate "Numancia", but only four days after the capitulation of Cartagena he published a document in the newspapers condemning the cantonal rebellion, despite being one of its main leaders and promoters. In the exculpatory letter he claimed that he was "in Cartagena because they wouldn't let me out" and that he had been "a prisoner, more of the besieged than the besiegers." And then he disqualified the cantonal movement and its leaders: «All my companions were very holy, very just heroes, but they were not good for the government of a village. [...] Federal Republicans: for the time being, let's not insist on raising federalism. It is an idea that is in the making. [...] Without abjuring my ideas, being what I always was, I recognize the current Government and I will be with it in the fight against absolutism». According to José Barón Fernández, after writing this, "Roque Barcia was discredited, forever, as a politician" and "became what we now call a demagogue".

List of cantons

The role of the International in the rebellion 
There has been a lot of discussion about the degree of participation of the International Workingmen's Association, but today it seems clear that the leaders of the International did not intervene in the cantonal rebellion and that the only place where internationalists took the initiative, in addition to the 'Petroleum Revolution' of Alcoy, was in San Lúcar de Barrameda – there a board was formed that was actually the Council of the section Local of the International, after the closure of the social premises by order of the authorities—, as recognized in a letter dated 4 August Tomás González Morago, member of the Federal Committee of the FRE-AIT: «The federation of Alcoy and San Lucar de Barrameda are the only ones that have attempted on their own account a movement against the established order of things." However, many "internationalists" participated in the rebellion, especially in Valencia and Seville, where some of them formed part of the Juntas. A letter from Francisco Tomás Oliver sent on 5 August to the IWA Commission recognized this:

In a later letter, dated 15 September, Tomás differentiated the Alcoy insurrection, "a purely working-class, revolutionary socialist movement", from the cantonal rebellion, a "purely political and bourgeois" movement, and affirmed that "Seville and Valencia are the only two cities in which the internationalists have triumphed", although he acknowledged that they had taken "a very active part in the events" in other towns, such as Cádiz, Granada, Jerez de la Frontera, San Fernando, Carmona, Lebrija, Paradas, Chipiona and San Lúcar de Barrameda, but that later had been "abandoned by the phonies". The consequence was that the repression also fell on the internationalists, especially after the formation of the government of Emilio Castelar.

On 16 August 1873, "The Federation", an organ of the FRE-AIT, explained why in its opinion the cantonal rebellion had failed:

See also
 First Spanish Republic
 Third Carlist War

References

Bibliography

External links
Cartagena-Cantón-1873, a group making a historical reenactment of the canton of Cartagena.

Anarchism in Spain
Federalism in Spain
History of Cartagena, Spain
Libertarian socialism
Revolutions in Spain
Wars involving Spain
Conflicts in 1873
1873 in Spain
Conflicts in 1874
1874 in Spain
19th-century rebellions
19th-century revolutions
Cantonalism in Spain
Naval mutinies